The Pink Doll is a Russian animated film directed by Valentin Olshvang, produced  in 1997.

Plot 
One girl had a tedious time all day long with her baby-sitter. When in the evening mother had come, the girl was glad to see her, but mother gave her a present and went to the meeting with an admirer. The girl stayed at home alone. In that present girl found a pink doll, that was the largest one in her collection. Girl began associating this doll as herself, and herself as her mother. This associations gives her deep feelings about this situation, where girl feels her as a bought off.

A fact 
This animation is made by technics of paint-on-glass animation.

Awards 
 The second place in competition of students film works for award  Saint Anna, 1997;
 Award on International Festival of Animated Films  Krok  in Kyiv, Ukraine, 1997;
 Silver Nail Award   for the best animated film on International Festival of Young Cinema Kinoforum, 1997;
  Silver Dove Award   at the International Festival of animated cinema in Leipzig, Germany, 1997;
 Award for the most dramatic plot in Russian festival of animation in Tarusa, 1997;
 Best First Film on International Cinema Festival in Zagreb, Croatia, 1998;
 Special award on International Animated Cinema Festival in Hiroshima, Japan, 1998;

References

External links 
 
 
 Russian Database of animated films

See also 
 2nd Open Russian Festival of Animated Film

1997 films
1990s Russian-language films
Russian animated short films
1997 short films
Paint-on-glass animated films